Malcolm, Malcom, Máel Coluim, or Maol Choluim may refer to:

People
 Malcolm (given name), includes a list of people and fictional characters
 Clan Malcolm
 Maol Choluim de Innerpeffray, 14th-century bishop-elect of Dunkeld

Nobility
 Máel Coluim, Earl of Atholl, Mormaer of Atholl between 1153/9 and the 1190s
 Máel Coluim, King of Strathclyde, 10th century
 Máel Coluim of Moray, Mormaer of Moray 1020–1029
 Máel Coluim (son of the king of the Cumbrians), possible King of Strathclyde or King of Alba around 1054
 Malcolm I of Scotland (died 954), King of Scots
 Malcolm II of Scotland, King of Scots from 1005 until his death
 Malcolm III of Scotland, King of Scots
 Malcolm IV of Scotland, King of Scots
 Máel Coluim, Earl of Angus, the fifth attested post 10th-century Mormaer of Angus
 Máel Coluim I, Earl of Fife, one of the more obscure Mormaers of Fife
 Maol Choluim I, Earl of Lennox, Mormaer
 Máel Coluim II, Earl of Fife, Mormaer
 Maol Choluim II, Earl of Lennox, Mormaer

Surname
 Arthur Malcolm (1934–2022), Australian Anglican bishop
 Christian Malcolm (born 1979), English sprinter
 David Malcolm (1938–2014), Chief Justice of the Supreme Court of Western Australia 1988–2006
 Derek Malcolm (born 1932), British film critic and historian
 Devon Malcolm (born 1963), English cricketer
 Donald G. Malcolm (1919–2007), American organizational theorist
 George A. Malcolm (1881–1961), Associate Justice of the Philippine Supreme Court
 Howard Malcom (1799–1879), American educator and Baptist minister
 James Peller Malcolm (1767–1815), American-English engraver and topographer
 Janet Malcolm (1934–2021), American writer and journalist
 Jeff Malcolm (born 1956), Australian boxer of the 1970s, '80s, '90s and 2000s 
 John Malcolm (1926–2008), Scottish actor
 Joyce Lee Malcolm (born 1941), American constitutional law professor
 Laura Malcolm (born 1991), English netball player
 Lavinia Malcolm (c.1847–1920), Scottish suffragist, politician, first Scottish woman female councillor and first female Lord Provost
 Mary Malcolm (1918–2010), BBC television announcer
 Noel Malcolm (born 1956), English writer, historian and journalist
 Norman Malcolm (1911–1990), American philosopher
 Peter Malcolm (rugby league) (active 1988), Australian rugby league footballer
 Peter Malcolm (rugby union) (born 1994), American rugby union player
 Ryan Malcolm (born 1979), Canadian singer
 Sally Malcolm (born 1969), British author and publisher
 Sharon Malcolm (1947–2019), American politician

Fiction
 Malcolm (Macbeth), Prince of Cumberland, a character in Shakespeare's Macbeth
 Ian Malcolm (character), a character from Michael Crichton's Jurassic Park series of books and films
 Malcolm Reynolds, the captain of the spaceship Serenity in Joss Whedon's TV series Firefly
 Malcolm Tucker, a character in Armando Iannucci's The Thick of It and In the Loop
 Jamie Fraser (character), in the Outlander a book series, sometimes uses the name Alexander Malcolm
 Malcolm, an evil court jester in the adventure game series The Legend of Kyrandia
 Malcolm, a fictional character in the Unreal Tournament game series
 Malcolm, a ship, where the story of Julio Cortázar's The Winners takes place

Television and film
 Malcolm X (film), 1992 biographical film about the activist and Black nationalist Muslim Malcolm X
 Malcolm (film), a 1986 Australian comedy film about an amateur inventor
 Malcolm in the Middle, American television series
 Malcolm (Malcolm in the Middle), the title character of the series
 Malcolm Merlyn (DC Comics), becomes Leader of the League of Assassins in the DC television show Arrow
 Malcolm & Eddie, American television situation comedy

Literature
 The Autobiography of Malcolm X, 1965 book
 Letters to Malcolm, a collection of letters written by C. S. Lewis, posthumously published in 1964
 Malcolm (novel), 1959 comic novel by James Purdy
 Malcolm, a 1965 stage adaptation of Purdy's novel by Edward Albee

Music
Malcolm Lincoln, Estonian electronic pop duo
Malcolm James McCormick, known professionally as Mac Miller, American rapper and record producer.

Places
 Malcom, Iowa, city in Poweshiek County
 Malcolm, Maryland, community in Charles County
 Malcolm, Nebraska, village in Lancaster County
 Malcolm, Western Australia, an abandoned town in Western Australia

See also 
 Malcombe